The Old Fremont Post Office is a historic building in Fremont, Nebraska. It was built in 1893–1895, and designed in the Richardsonian Romanesque architectural style by W.J. Edbrooke William T. White was hired as the builder, and Charles W. Guindele as the interior designer. On October 3, 1893, former Republican Congressman George Washington Emery Dorsey dedicated the building, even though it was still under construction. It has been listed on the National Register of Historic Places since February 29, 1996.

References

	
National Register of Historic Places in Dodge County, Nebraska
Richardsonian Romanesque architecture in Nebraska
Government buildings completed in 1893
Post office buildings on the National Register of Historic Places in Nebraska